Jujeng (also Romanized as Jūjeng) is a village in Qaleh Asgar Rural District, Lalehzar District, Bardsir County, Kerman Province, Iran. At the 2006 census, its population was 121, in 30 families.

References 

Populated places in Bardsir County